Breno Cesar Valerio Gonzaga (born April 21, 1995), known as Breno Cezar, is a Brazilian football player.

References

External links

1995 births
Living people
Brazilian footballers
J3 League players
SC Sagamihara players
Association football defenders